The 2020 Brussels Cycling Classic was the 100th edition of the Brussels Cycling Classic road cycling one day race. It was held on 30 August 2020 as a 1.Pro event as part of the 2020 UCI Europe Tour and the 2020 UCI ProSeries.

Teams
Eight UCI WorldTeams, ten UCI ProTeams, and two UCI Continental teams made up the twenty teams that participated in the race. Most teams entered seven riders; however,  and  entered six each, while  and  entered five each. Of the 134 riders who started the race, only 112 riders finished.

UCI WorldTeams

 
 
 
 
 
 
 
 

UCI ProTeams

 
 
 
 
 
 
 
 
 
 

UCI Continental Teams

Results

References

External links

2020 Brussels Cycling Classic
Brussels Cycling Classic
Brussels Cycling Classic
Brussels Cycling Classic
Brussels Cycling Classic